Neelapalle is the major panchayat village in Thallarevu mandal in East Godavari district.

Villages in East Godavari district